Denmark participated in the Eurovision Song Contest 2018 with the song "Higher Ground" written by Niclas Arn and Karl Eurén. The song was performed by Rasmussen. The Danish broadcaster DR organised the national final Dansk Melodi Grand Prix 2018 in order to select the Danish entry for the 2018 contest in Lisbon, Portugal. Ten songs competed in a televised show where "Higher Ground" performed by Rasmussen was the winner as decided upon through the combination of jury voting and public voting over two rounds.

Denmark was drawn to compete in the second semi-final of the Eurovision Song Contest which took place on 10 May 2018. Performing during the show in position 5, "Higher Ground" was announced among the top 10 entries of the second semi-final and therefore qualified to compete in the final on 12 May. It was later revealed that Denmark placed fifth out of the 18 participating countries in the semi-final with 204 points. In the final, Denmark performed in position 15 and placed ninth out of the 26 participating countries, scoring 226 points.

Background 

In the 2017 contest, "Where I Am" performed by Anja Nissen qualified Denmark to the final placing twentieth.

The Danish national broadcaster, DR, broadcasts the event within Denmark and organises the selection process for the nation's entry. DR confirmed their intentions to participate at the 2018 Eurovision Song Contest on 4 July 2017. Denmark has selected all of their Eurovision entries through the national final Dansk Melodi Grand Prix. Along with their participation confirmation, the broadcaster announced that Dansk Melodi Grand Prix 2018 would be organised in order to select Denmark's entry for the 2018 contest.

Before Eurovision

Dansk Melodi Grand Prix 2018

Dansk Melodi Grand Prix 2018 was the 48th edition of Dansk Melodi Grand Prix, the music competition that selects Denmark's entries for the Eurovision Song Contest. The event was held on 10 February 2018 at the Gigantium in Aalborg, hosted by Annette Heick and Johannes Nymark and televised on DR1 as well as streamed online at DR TV. The national final was watched by 1.393 million viewers in Denmark.

Format 
Ten songs competed in one show where the winner was determined over two rounds of voting. In the first round, the top three songs based on the combination of votes from a public vote and a five-member jury panel qualified to the superfinal. In the superfinal, the winner was determined by the public and jury vote. Viewers were able to vote via SMS or a mobile application specifically designed for the competition. Viewers using the app to cast a vote were provided with one free vote. The five-member jury panel was composed of five Danish Eurovision fans: Julie Lund Mikkelsen, Jens Erik Møller, Morten Madsen, Christian Kaad and Anna Bennike.

Competing entries 
DR opened a submission period on 4 July 2017 for artists and composers to submit their entries. Entries could be submitted throughout the year, however only songs submitted by 15 September 2017 were considered for the 2018 edition of the competition. Mads Enggaard, who was appointed as the new music producer of Dansk Melodi Grand Prix, stated that the competition would seek out "songs that are inspiring and create pictures and arouse emotions". 30 songs were shortlisted from the entries submitted to the broadcaster and a selection committee of Dansk Melodi Grand Prix fans, members of the public and industry professionals selected ten songs. DR held a press meet and greet at the Koncerthuset in Copenhagen on 22 January 2018 where the competing artists and songs were announced and officially presented.

Final 
The final took place on 10 February 2018. In the first round of voting the top three advanced to a superfinal based on the votes of a five-member jury (50%) and a public vote (50%). In the superfinal, the winner, "Higher Ground" performed by Rasmussen, was selected by the public and jury vote. In addition to the performances of the competing entries, Austrian Eurovision Song Contest 2014 winner Conchita Wurst performed as the interval act.

Promotion 
Rasmussen made several appearances across Europe to specifically promote "Higher Ground" as the Danish Eurovision entry. On 5 April, Rasmussen performed during the London Eurovision Party, which was held at the Café de Paris venue in London, United Kingdom and hosted by Nicki French and Paddy O'Connell. Between 8 and 11 April, Rasmussen took part in promotional activities in Tel Aviv, Israel and performed during the Israel Calling event held at the Rabin Square. On 14 April, Rasmussen performed during the Eurovision in Concert event which was held at the AFAS Live venue in Amsterdam, Netherlands and hosted by Edsilia Rombley and Cornald Maas.

At Eurovision 
According to Eurovision rules, all nations with the exceptions of the host country and the "Big Five" (France, Germany, Italy, Spain and the United Kingdom) are required to qualify from one of two semi-finals in order to compete for the final; the top ten countries from each semi-final progress to the final. The European Broadcasting Union (EBU) split up the competing countries into six different pots based on voting patterns from previous contests, with countries with favourable voting histories put into the same pot. On 29 January 2018, a special allocation draw was held which placed each country into one of the two semi-finals, as well as which half of the show they would perform in. Denmark was placed into the second semi-final, to be held on 10 May 2018, and was scheduled to perform in the first half of the show.

Once all the competing songs for the 2018 contest had been released, the running order for the semi-finals was decided by the shows' producers rather than through another draw, so that similar songs were not placed next to each other. Denmark was set to perform in position 5, following the entry from San Marino and before the entry from Russia.

The two semi-finals and final were broadcast on DR1 with commentary by Ole Tøpholm. The Danish spokesperson, who announced the top 12-point score awarded by the Danish jury during the final, was Ulla Essendrop.

Semi-final

Rasmussen took part in technical rehearsals on 1 and 5 May, followed by dress rehearsals on 9 and 10 May. This included the jury show on 9 May where the professional juries of each country watched and voted on the competing entries.

The Danish performance featured Rasmussen dressed in a black costume and performing with four backing vocalists. The stage colours were predominantly blue and white and white sails were located on both sides of the stage. During the final chorus of the song, one of the backing vocalists went to the back of the stage and waved a big white flag with several effects including snow and a wind machine. Following technical rehearsals, the Danish delegation requested a harsher snowfall effect as the snow provided by the Portuguese broadcaster was too light and fluffy for the song. This request was granted. The four backing vocalists that joined Rasmussen on stage were: Daniel Firth, Gustav Emil Bresler, Jesper Paasch and Mads Engelhardt. An additional off-stage backing vocalist was also featured: Anders Ørsager.

At the end of the show, Denmark was announced as having finished in the top 10 and subsequently qualifying for the grand final. It was later revealed that Denmark placed fifth in the semi-final, receiving a total of 204 points: 164 points from the televoting and 40 points from the juries.

Final
Shortly after the second semi-final, a winners' press conference was held for the ten qualifying countries. As part of this press conference, the qualifying artists took part in a draw to determine which half of the grand final they would subsequently participate in. This draw was done in the order the countries were announced during the semi-final. Denmark was drawn to compete in the second half. Following this draw, the shows' producers decided upon the running order of the final, as they had done for the semi-finals. Denmark was subsequently placed to perform in position 15, following the entry from the Czech Republic and before the entry from Australia.

Rasmussen once again took part in dress rehearsals on 11 and 12 May before the final, including the jury final where the professional juries cast their final votes before the live show. Rasmussen performed a repeat of his semi-final performance during the final on 12 May. Denmark placed ninth in the final, scoring 226 points: 188 points from the televoting and 38 points from the juries.

Voting
Voting during the three shows involved each country awarding two sets of points from 1-8, 10 and 12: one from their professional jury and the other from televoting. Each nation's jury consisted of five music industry professionals who are citizens of the country they represent, with their names published before the contest to ensure transparency. This jury judged each entry based on: vocal capacity; the stage performance; the song's composition and originality; and the overall impression by the act. In addition, no member of a national jury was permitted to be related in any way to any of the competing acts in such a way that they cannot vote impartially and independently. The individual rankings of each jury member as well as the nation's televoting results were released shortly after the grand final.

Below is a breakdown of points awarded to Denmark and awarded by Denmark in the second semi-final and grand final of the contest, and the breakdown of the jury voting and televoting conducted during the two shows:

Points awarded to Denmark

Points awarded by Denmark

Detailed voting results
The following members comprised the Danish jury:
 Brian Risberg Clausen (Bryan Rice; jury chairperson)singer
 Søs Fengersinger and songwriter
 Emmelie de Forestsinger, winner of the Eurovision Song Contest 2013
 Linda Andreasen (Linda Andrews)singer and songwriter
 Lasse Melingsinger and songwriter

References

External links 
Official DR Eurovision site

2018
Countries in the Eurovision Song Contest 2018
Eurovision
Eurovision